The 2009 Marion Mayhem season was the fourth season for the Continental Indoor Football League (CIFL) franchise. The Mayhem finished the regular season with a 9-3 record in 2009. This was good enough to earn them the 2009 CIFL East Division Regular Season Title and the opportunity to host the East Division Championship Game. This was the third season in a row the Mayhem made the playoffs. Their opponent in the East Division Championship Game was the Fort Wayne Freedom (6-5). Coming into the game the Freedom had been experiencing money problems and up until three days before the East Division Championship Game the Freedom still were not sure they were going to show up in Marion. But when game time came the Freedom, whom brought a smaller than usual roster that had not practiced regularly for a couple of weeks, played with more heart and determination then the Mayhem and won 49-40.

Schedule

2009 standings

References

2009 Continental Indoor Football League season
Marion Mayhem
Marion Mayhem